The Game : Towards Zero is a 2020 South Korean television series starring Ok Taec-yeon, Lee Yeon-hee and Lim Ju-hwan. It aired on MBC TV from January 22 to March 12, 2020.

Synopsis
Tae-Pyeong (Ok Taec-yeon) has a prophet like ability. When he looks into someone's eye, he can see the exact moment when they die. Tae-Pyeong lives in a mansion with Teacher Baek (Jung Dong-hwan) and Attorney Lee Yeon-Hwa (Ryu Hye-rin).

A girl is kidnapped and her disappearance may involve the notorious Midnight Killer. While Tae-Pyeong helps the police with the investigation, he is stunned when he meets Detective Joon-Young (Lee Yeon-hee). She is the first person that he can't foresee their death. Tae-Pyeong and Detective Joon-Young frantically work together to stop the Midnight Killer.

Cast

Main
 Ok Taec-yeon as Kim Tae-pyeong
A prophet who can foresee anyone's death just by looking into their eyes. This changes when he meets Joon-yeong whose death he cannot see.
 Lee Yeon-hee as Seo Joon-yeong
 Joo Ye-rim as Young Seo Joon-yeong
A detective who works at Yongsan Police Station. She partners with a prophet to solve a mysterious murder case.
 Lim Ju-hwan as Gu Do-kyung
A forensic expert. He is a perfectionist who digs through every case.

Supporting
 Park Ji-il as Nam Woo-hyeon
 Choi Jae-woong as Han Dong-woo
 Shin Sung-min as Yoon Kang-jae
 Lee Seung-woo as Go Bong-soo
 Lee Bom as Ji Soo-hyeon
 Park Won-sang as Lee Joon-hee
 Yoo Se-hyung as Sung Min-jae	
 Hong In as Park Han-gyoo
 Yoon Ji-won as Oh Ye-ji
 Jung Dong-hwan as Teacher Baek
 Ryu Hye-rin as Lee Yeon-hwa
 Jang So-yeon as Yoo Ji-won
 Choi Da-in as Lee Mi-jin
 Kim Yong-joon as Jo Pil-doo
 Ye Soo-jung as Mrs. Jeong
 Yang Hyeong-min as Oh Seong-min
 Kim Hak-sun as Seo Dong-cheol

Special appearances 
 Jang Gwang as Retired medical examiner (Ep.17-18)

Original soundtrack

Part 1

Part 2

Part 3

Part 4

Part 5

Part 6

Production
Ok Taec-yeon and Lee Yeon-hee previously starred together in Marriage Blue (2013).

Ratings
In this table,  represent the lowest ratings and  represent the highest ratings.

Awards and nominations

Notes

References

External links
  
 
 

MBC TV television dramas
Korean-language television shows
2020 South Korean television series debuts
2020 South Korean television series endings
South Korean mystery television series
South Korean crime television series